Rou Shi (28 September 1902 – 7 February 1931) was a prominent left-wing Chinese writer and member of the May Fourth Movement. Executed on either 7 or 8 February 1931 by the Kuomintang government in Shanghai for his pro-Communist activities, he is considered one of the Five Martyrs of the League of Left-Wing Writers.

Early life and career
Rou Shi was born Zhao Pingfu on 28 September 1902 in Ninghai County, Zhejiang. In 1918 he entered Hangzhou No. 1 Normal School in the provincial capital Hangzhou. After graduating in 1923, he became a teacher at Pudi Elementary School in Cixi City. In 1925 he published his first collection of short stories, Madman.

In 1925 Rou Shi studied briefly at Peking University, but returned to Zhejiang in the spring of 1926, teaching in Hangzhou and Zhenhai. In the summer of 1927 he returned to his hometown Ninghai and taught at Ninghai High School, a local Communist base. After the failed Communist rebellion in May 1928, he took refuge in Shanghai, where he was introduced to the leading leftist writer Lu Xun, who lived nearby. Together with Lu Xun and others, he cofounded the Morning Flower Society (朝花社), which published several progressive journals. Lu Xun stated that the purpose of the Society was to "introduce literature from Eastern and Northern Europe and import foreign woodcuts." In January 1929 Rou Shi succeeded Lu Xun as the editor of the journal Tattler. During this period he wrote the novel February and another collection of short stories entitled Hope. He also translated works by foreign writers such as Maxim Gorky.

In March 1930, the League of Left-Wing Writers was established in Shanghai. Rou Shi attended its inaugural meeting, and became an executive and standing committee member in charge of the League publication Meng Ya. He joined the Communist Party of China in May 1930, and published the short story, "A Slave Mother".

Arrest and execution
On 17 January 1931, while attending a secret Communist Party meeting at the Oriental Hotel in the Shanghai International Settlement, Rou Shi was arrested, along with 35 other attendees, by the Shanghai Municipal Police. They were handed over to the Kuomintang government and held in prison for three weeks. On 7 February 1931, the Kuomintang executed 23 Communists in Longhua, Shanghai. The five members of the Left League executed on that day, Rou Shi, Li Weisen, Hu Yepin, Yin Fu, and Feng Keng, are called the Five Martyrs of the League of Left-Wing Writers by the Communist Party. Among the executed were three women, one pregnant. They were executed either by gunshot or by being buried alive. According to Frank Moraes, Rou Shi was in the latter group, but an article on Xinhua says he was killed by gunshots. In the essay "Remembrance for the Sake of Forgetting", Lu Xun states that Rou Shi was shot ten times.

Select bibliography

Works in English
 "A Wife's Farewell" (1929), translated by Di Fan
 "A Slave Mother" (1930), translated by Edgar Snow (1936)
 Threshold of Spring (1929), translated by Sidney Shapiro (1980)
 "Destruction", in Threshold of Spring (1980)
 "A Hired Wife" (1930), in Threshold of Spring (1980)

Works in Chinese
Short story collections
 Madman (1925)
 Slave (1928)
 Hope (1930)

Novels
 Death of the Old Times (1926)
 February (1929)
 Three Sisters (1929)

Dramas
 Comedy of the World

Nonfiction
 Curse (1925)
 A Strong Impression (1930)
 Child Stealing Fruit
 Choosing a Place To Die
 Seeing the Doctor
 A Youngster Selling Pens
 Tricked
 A Dream of White
 June Benefactor

Poetry
 "War!" (1925)
 "Blood Is Boiling" (1930)
 "Autumn Wind Comes from the West"

Translations and adaptations
One of Rou Shi's best known short stories, A Slave Mother, was first translated to English by Edgar Snow in 1936. In 1963, February was adapted to the critically acclaimed film Early Spring in February, which was directed by Xie Tieli and starred Sun Daolin, Shangguan Yunzhu, and Xie Fang. In 2003, A Slave Mother was adapted to a television film starring He Lin, who won the Best Actress award of the 2005 International Emmy Award for her performance in the film.

Memorials
On the 100th anniversary of his birth in 2002, Rou Shi's hometown, Ninghai, restored his former residence and opened it as a museum in his memory. The county also opened the newly built Rou Shi Park covering an area of 250 mu.

References

Bibliography

1902 births
1931 deaths
Writers from Ningbo
People executed by the Republic of China
People executed by smothering
Deaths by live burial
Executed writers
Executed people from Zhejiang
Republic of China short story writers
Chinese male short story writers
Chinese male novelists
Short story writers from Zhejiang